Dita and the Family Business is a 2001 documentary film directed by Joshua Taylor and Ferne Pearlstein about Taylor's own family, who owned the New York City department store Bergdorf Goodman. It was first released at the 2001 San Diego Latino Film Festival.

See also
Scatter My Ashes at Bergdorf's, a 2013 documentary film about the store

References

External links

 Trailer for Dita and The Family Business at Vimeo
 Full Length Dita and The Family Business at Vimeo

2001 films
American documentary films
Documentary films about businesspeople
Documentary films about families
2001 documentary films
Documentary films about New York City
Films set in Manhattan
2000s English-language films
2000s American films